Elsmore is a rural village, with a population of 327 (2006), in Gough County on the Northern Tablelands, New South Wales, Australia. The village is situated 10 km east of Inverell, New South Wales, just north of the Macintyre River and is within Inverell Shire.

History
The first official licensees of this run were Campbell & Muir in 1839. In 1843 the owners were Brown & Alcorn. The recorded stock numbers in 1850 were: 66 horses, 1,300 cattle and no sheep. Alexander Campbell of Inverell Station owned Elsmore in 1852.

Around 1870 Joseph Wills, a shepherd, is believed to have been the first to find tin in the New England district. These heavy black grains that he found near Elsmore aroused his curiosity.  Shortly after selling these to a traveller from Sydney a rush began to search the tin fields around here, Inverell and other nearby areas. The Elsmore mine was the first commercial tin mine in Australia and has produced tin from various alluvial deposits intermittently since 1871. The adjacent Sheep Station Hill has seen only minor scale hard rock and alluvial mining.

Elsmore Post Office opened on 1 February 1873 and closed in 1992.

The main industries are mining and agriculture.

The Bruderhof started a community known as Danthonia in Elsmore in 1999.  They farm, produce signs and operate a publishing house.

References

"Inverell Shire Information", c.1981

Mining towns in New South Wales
Towns in New England (New South Wales)
Inverell Shire